= Seated Bodhisattva (left attendant of a triad) =

- 목조보살좌상조선 (Korean)
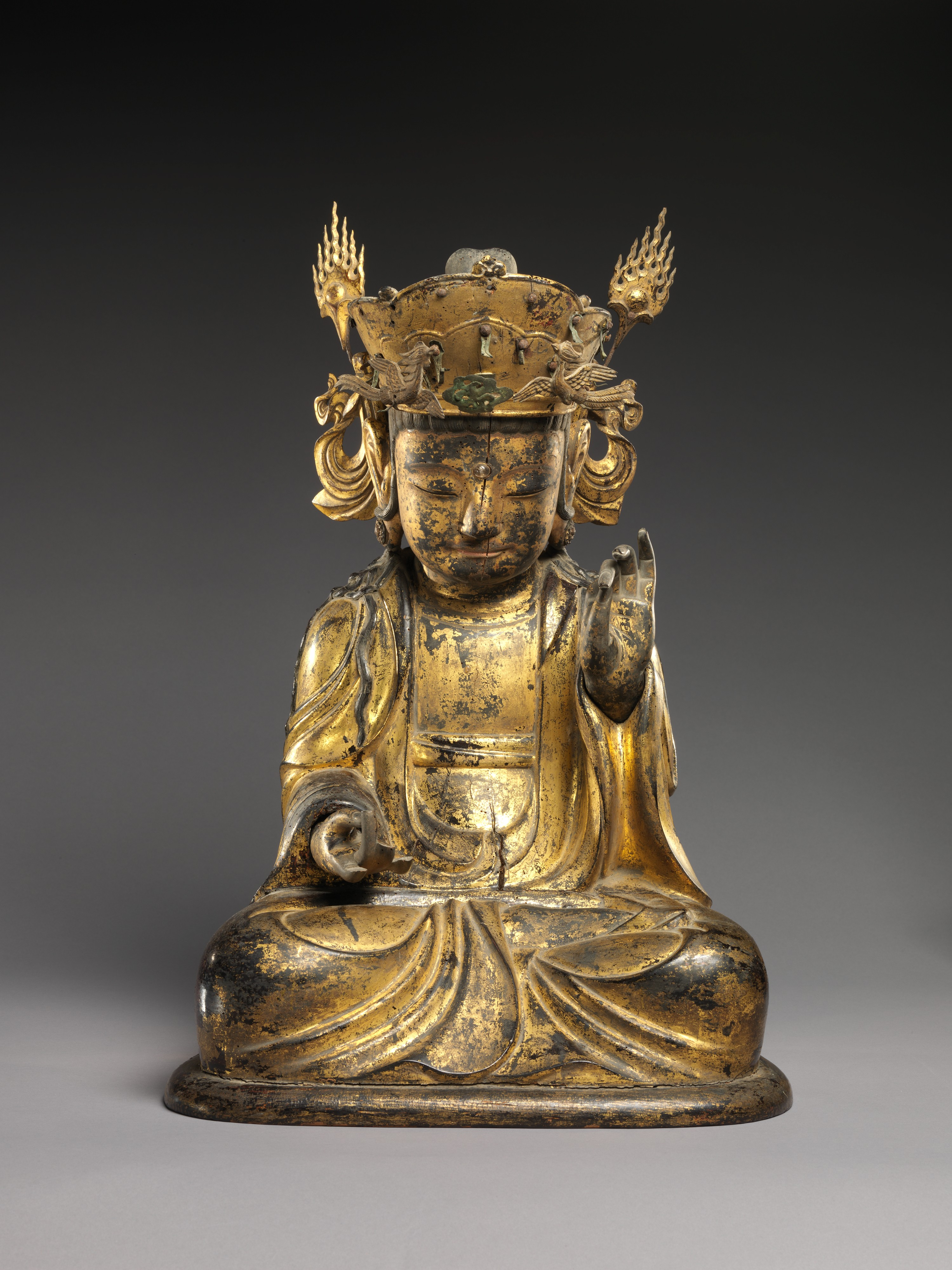
- Year: ca. mid-17th century (Joseon dynasty)
- Type: sculpture
- Medium: Gilt wood
- Dimensions: 51.4 cm × 35.6 cm (20.2 in × 14.0 in)
- Location: Metropolitan Museum of Art, New York
- Accession: 2015.300.301a–c

Seated Bodhisattva (left attendant of a triad) (Korean: 목조보살좌상; Chinese: 木造菩薩坐像) is a statue of a Bodhisattva belonging to the mid-17th century, Joseon dynastic period of Korean Peninsula. The statue, made of gilt wood, was originally one of the two attendant Bodhisattva figures that flanked a central Shakyamuni or Amitabha Buddha statue. It is believed that this Bodhisattva was the left attendant Bodhisattva of the triad. The tall ornate crown, oblong face and drapery with cascading folds of the statue indicate that the statue was probably produced in a Buddhist sculpture school in South Jeolla province, Korea. This statue was granted to the Metropolitan Museum of Art by Mary and Jackson Berke Foundation in 2015.

== Description ==
This elaborate statue depicts an image of a Bodhisattva. Bodhisattvas are considered as compassionate, enlightened beings who are destined to be the protectors of their followers in Mahayana Buddhism. Also Bodhisattvas are the beings who are qualified to attain the enlightenment. Made of gilt wood, this statue was created in the mid-17th century AD, during Korean Peninsula's Joseon dynasty period. The features of the statue such as the tall ornate crown, oblong face and cascading folds of the drapery indicate that this statue was likely produced by an esteemed school of Buddhist monk sculptors led by Ingyun (active during 1615–1663 AD) for a Buddhist temple in South Jeolla province, Korea. This area was then an important centre of Korean Buddhism. A decorative element in the shape of flames can be seen in the crown. This statue measures 51.4 cm in height, 35.6 cm in width and 36.2 in depth. From base to the flame statue measures 54.6 cm in height. The statue, which was originally in the Mary Griggs Berke Collection, was later given to Metropolitan Museum of Art, New York City, United States by Mary and Jackson Berke Foundation in 2015. This statue has been exhibited four times in the Metropolitan Museum of Art before and after it was granted to the museum.

== Gallery ==
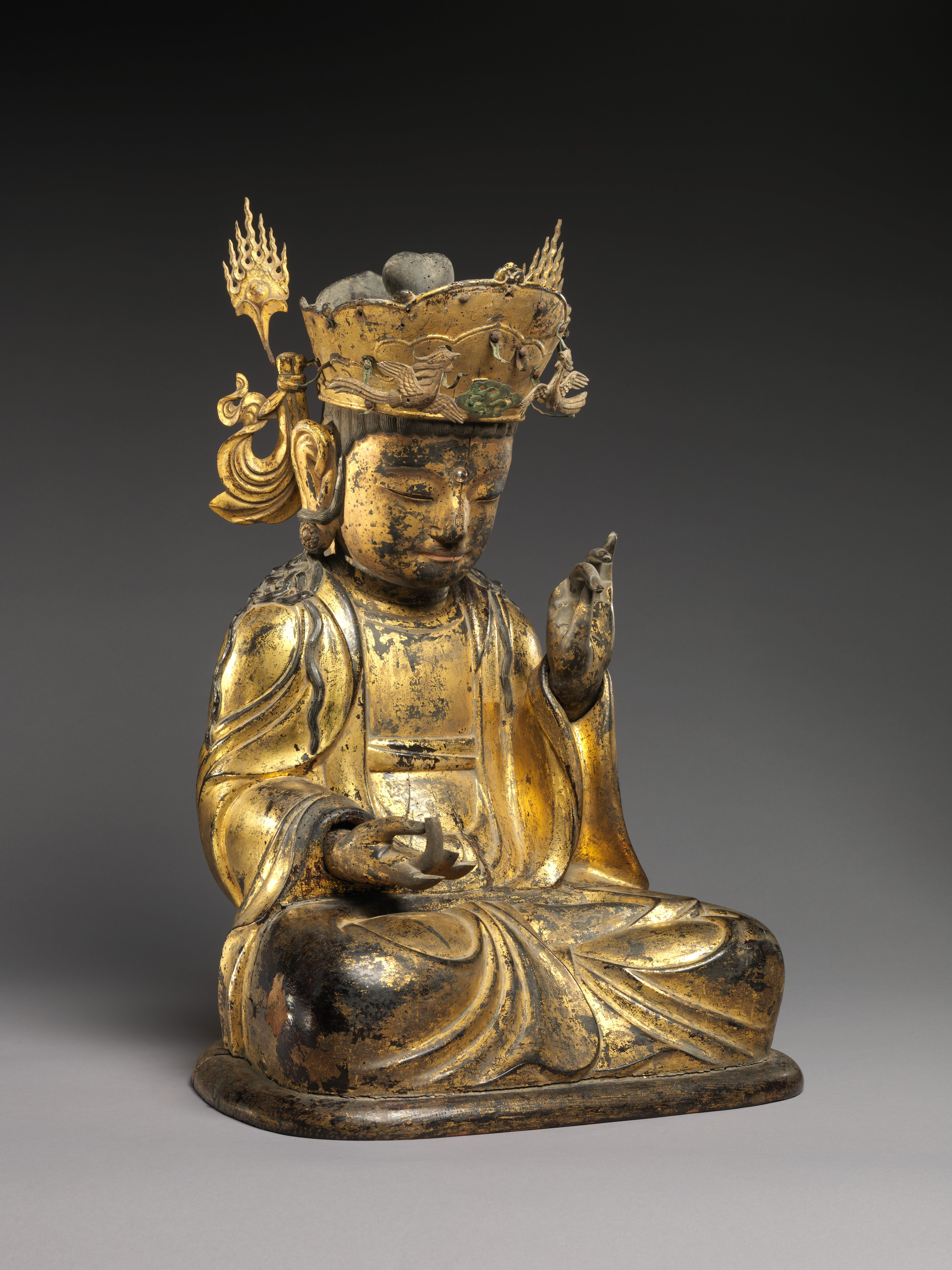
Lateral view of the statue

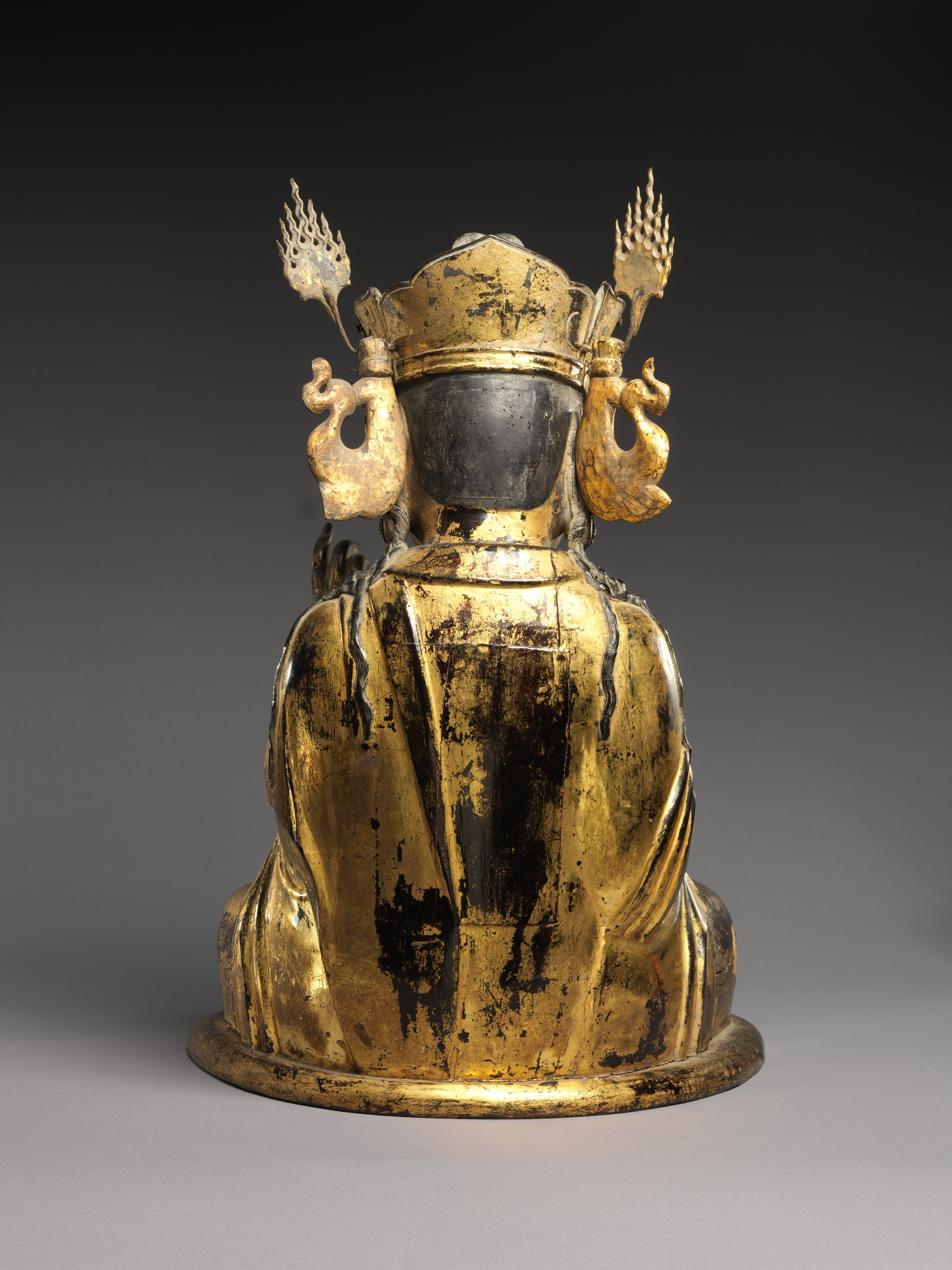
Posterior view of the statue

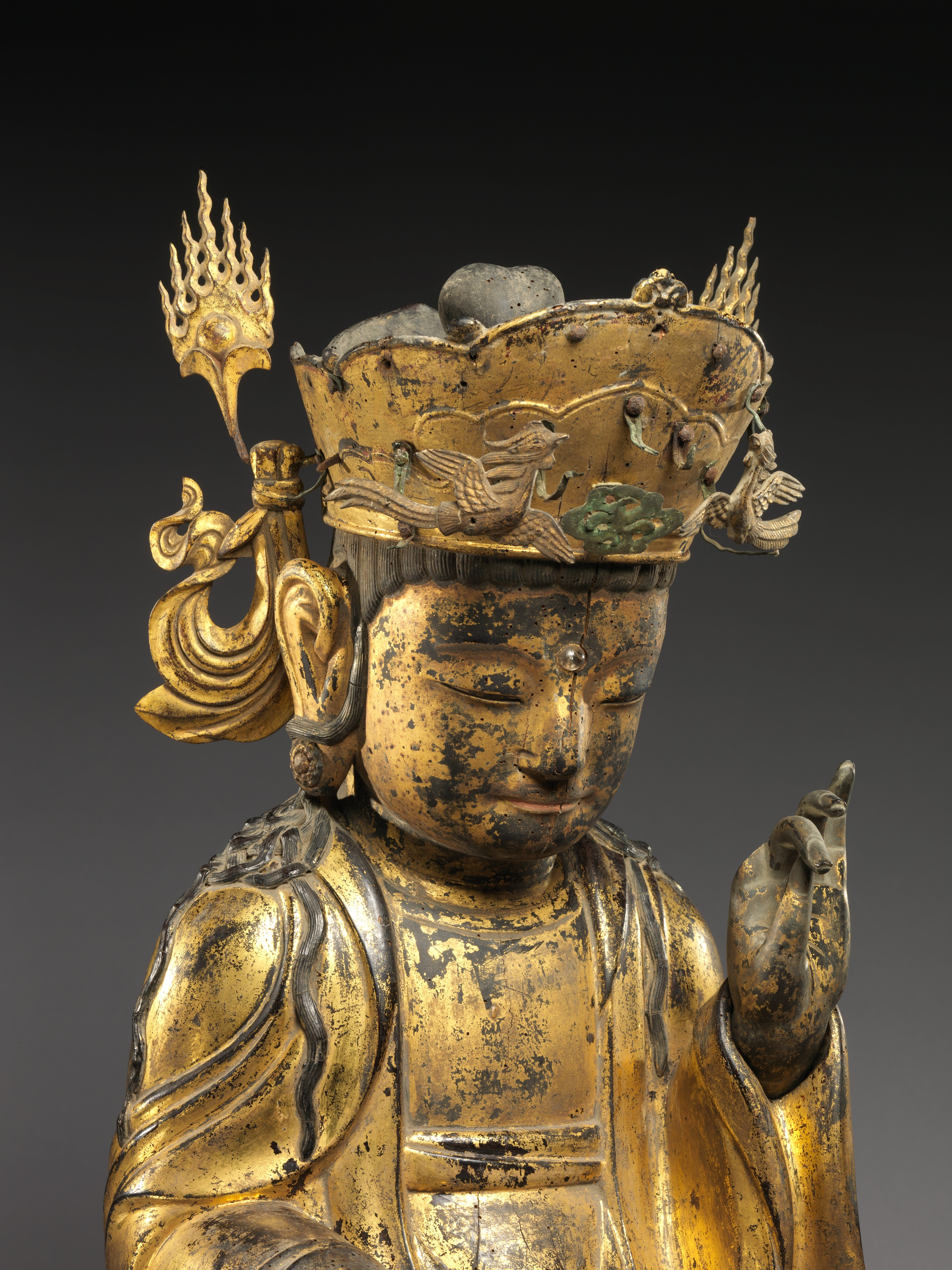
Closeup look of the Bodhisattva

== External reading ==
- Lee Soyoung (October 2004). A Seated Bodhisattva in the Collection of the Mary and Jackson Burke Foundation. Vol. 7. New York. pp. 90–91.
- Marylin M. Rhie (2010). Early Buddhist Art of China and Central Asia. Vol. 3.
